Yves Pierracci (26 July 1918 – 26 July 1983) was a French racing cyclist. He rode in the 1947 Tour de France.

References

External links

1918 births
1983 deaths
French male cyclists
Sportspeople from Gard